Pantherodes pardalaria is a species of moth in the family Geometridae first described by Jacob Hübner in 1823.

Description
These moths have yellow wings with leopard-like blue-grey blotches.

Distribution
This species can be found in Argentina, Brazil, Colombia  and Paraguay.

References

 Animal Diversity
 Eco Registros
 Insectarium Virtual

Geometridae
Moths described in 1823